Teresia Muthoni Gateri (born 5 January 2002) is a Kenyan long-distance runner who specializes in the 3000 metres. She was the gold medallist at the World Athletics U20 Championships in 2021.

References

External links 

 Teresia Muthoni Gateri at World Athletics

2002 births
Living people
Kenyan female long-distance runners
Kenyan female middle-distance runners
World Athletics U20 Championships winners